Narayandas Laddha High School is a high school located in Amravati, Maharashtra, India, established in 1963

References

 

High schools and secondary schools in Maharashtra
Education in Amravati
Educational institutions established in 1963
1963 establishments in Maharashtra